Here in After is the second album by Immolation. It was released on February 13, 1996 through Metal Blade Records after the band was dropped from Roadrunner Records. This is the last album to feature drummer Craig Smilowski; Alex Hernandez joined the band on their 1999 release, Failures for Gods.

Track listing

Personnel
Immolation
Ross Dolan – vocals, bass
Craig Smilowski – drums
Robert Vigna – lead guitar
Thomas Wilkinson – rhythm guitar

Production
Brian J Ames – design
Wayne Dorell – engineering, mixing, producer
Jim Forbes – assistant producer
Brad Hyman – photography
Andreas Marschall – cover art
Eddy Schreyer – mastering
Jeff Wolfe – live photography

References

1996 albums
Immolation (band) albums
Metal Blade Records albums